Dichorda iridaria, the showy emerald moth, is a moth of the  family Geometridae. The species was first described by Achille Guenée in 1857. It is found in North America, where it has been recorded from Alabama, Arkansas, Florida, Georgia, Illinois, Indiana, Iowa, Kentucky, Maryland, Massachusetts, Mississippi, New Hampshire, New Jersey, New York, North Carolina, Ohio, Oklahoma, Ontario, Pennsylvania, Quebec, South Carolina, Tennessee, Texas, Virginia, West Virginia and Wisconsin.

The wingspan is about 25–28 mm.

The larvae feed on Rhus species, including Rhus typhina and Rhus copallina. and Toxicodendron radicans.

Subspecies
Dichorda iridaria iridaria (from Texas to Quebec, Ontario, Nova Scotia, Missouri, Kansas)
Dichorda iridaria remotaria (Walker, 1861) (from Florida to South Carolina)

References

Moths described in 1857
Geometrinae